The Sandvika Tunnel is the name of a road tunnel that runs through the hill Sandviksåsen east of Sandvika in Norway. It forms a part of the Norwegian National Road 164, and near its northern entrance lies Sandvika Station. It was opened in 1991.

References

Tunnels in Bærum
Road tunnels in Viken
Tunnels completed in 1991
1991 establishments in Norway